The  singles Tournament at the 2006 Qatar Telecom German Open took place between May 5  and May 13 on the outdoor clay courts of the Rot-Weiss Tennis Club in Berlin, Germany. Nadia Petrova won the title, defeating Justine Henin-Hardenne in the final. This was the third consecutive tournament win for Petrova over a span of a month, extending her winning streak to a career-high 15 matches.

Seeds

Draw

Finals

Top half

Section 1

Section 2

Bottom half

Section 3

Section 4

Qualifying

Seeds

Qualifiers

Qualifying draw

First qualifier

Second qualifier

Third qualifier

Fourth qualifier

Fifth qualifier

Sixth qualifier

Seventh qualifier

Eighth qualifier

References
 Main Draw

2006 Singles
Qatar Telecom German Open - Singles